Scovel is a surname. Notable people with the surname include:

Florence Scovel Shinn (1871–1940), American artist and book illustrator
Rory Scovel (born 1980), American comedian, writer, and actor
Sylvester H. Scovel (1869–1905), American journalist

See also
Scovell